The Buffalo Common Council is the legislative branch of the city of Buffalo, New York government.  It is a representative assembly, with one elected member from each of nine districts: Niagara, Delaware, Masten, Ellicott, Lovejoy, Fillmore, North, University, and South.  In the past, the Common Council also had as many as five at-large members and a Council President who were elected citywide. Each council seat is elected for a four-year term, with elections occurring during off-years, between mid-term elections and presidential elections.

History
From Buffalo's incorporation in 1832 the common council existed under New York State charters. In the early years of the common council the Buffalo Mayor, the head of the executive branch of the Buffalo government was also the president of the common council, head of the legislative branch. From 1832 to 1854 all mayors were also Common Council President. Eli Cook was the first mayor who did not serve as Common Council President for his whole term as mayor. From 1832–1913, no mayor served as Common Council President. In 1914, New York State charters established a council that consisted of five members – a mayor and four council members. From 1913 to 1927, the council was composed of the mayor, Commissioner of Finance and Accounts, Commissioner of Public Works, Commissioner of Parks and Public Buildings, Commissioner of Public Affairs, and the mayor was the chairman of the board. In 1926, the Kenefick Commission was appointed to form a new city charter after New York State authorized its cities to write their own charters in 1924. Since 1927, no Mayor has presided over the common council.

A 1983 downsizing eliminated two at-large members. A 2002 downsizing eliminated the remaining three at-large members and the elected Common Council President. The size of the council's membership has been shrinking roughly in tandem with the decrease in population.

Composition

Members
The Democratic Party is the dominant party in Buffalo politics; no Republican or other party member has won a seat on the council in several decades, and all nine seats are currently held by Democrats.  As of January 1, 2020 the current membership is as follows:

According to the web site of the City of Buffalo, there is a Majority Leader and a Minority Leader if there are members from more than one political party. In practice, there is a majority leader even when all members of the council are from the same political party; a local law was passed in November 2002 to allow this. Mr. Scanlon was appointed by a majority of the Council on May 16, 2012, to fill the vacancy created when Michael P. Kearns won a seat on the New York State Assembly in a special election to fill a vacancy there. Mr. Scanlon secured his seat by winning in a subsequent general election. The term of all Common Council members expires in January 2024.

Committees and Organizations
Budget Committee
Buffalo Urban Renewal Agency (BURA)
Civil Service Committee
Claims Committee
Community Development Committee
Education Committee
Finance Committee
Joint Schools Construction Board
Legislative Committee
Minority Business Enterprise (MBE) Committee
Police Oversight
Rules Committee
Transportation Committee
Water Front Committee

References

External links
 Legislative Branch - The Common Council City of Buffalo website - leadership
History of the Common Council The Buffalo Common Council- Through the Years
 Buffalo Common Council Proceedings: Online Editions Digitized versions of Council Proceedings

Government of Buffalo, New York
New York (state) city councils